Freeman Peak is a  mountain summit located in Lemhi County, Idaho, United States.

Description
Freeman Peak is part of the Beaverhead Mountains which are a subset of the Bitterroot Range. The peak is situated 12 miles northeast of Salmon, Idaho, in the Salmon–Challis National Forest. The summit lies less than one-half mile west of the Continental Divide and the Idaho–Montana border. Precipitation runoff from the mountain drains to the Salmon River via Freeman Creek (north slope) and Kirtley Creek (south slope). This landform's toponym was officially adopted in 1969 by the United States Board on Geographic Names. The name honors James Freeman, a pioneer rancher of Lemhi County who lived along Freeman Creek. Freeman Creek was also called Oro Cache Creek (Gold Cache) due to the mining in this area.

Climate
Based on the Köppen climate classification, Freeman Peak is located in an alpine subarctic climate zone with long, cold, snowy winters, and cool to warm summers. Winter temperatures can drop below −10 °F with wind chill factors below −30 °F.

See also
 List of mountain peaks of Idaho

References

External links
 Freeman Peak: Idaho: A Climbing Guide
 Freeman Peak: weather forecast

Mountains of Idaho
Mountains of Lemhi County, Idaho
North American 3000 m summits
Salmon-Challis National Forest
Bitterroot Range